Hot Limit is a one-shot Japanese manga written by Minori Shima and illustrated by Akira Kanbe. It was serialised in Nihon Bungeisha's manga magazine, Nichibun Comics. It is licensed in North America by Digital Manga Publishing, which released the manga through its imprint, Juné, on August 12, 2008. Nihon Bungeisha released the manga on August 28, 2006.

Reception
ActiveAnime's Rachel Bentham commends that the manga's art as "racy, sexy and hot". Coolstreak Comics' Leroy Douresseaux comments that the manga "offers the best of BL and yaoi – intense romantic love between two men and hot sex!" Mania.com's Nadia Oxford comments that the manga "remains completely entrenched in yaoi stereotypes. To begin with, Kazuma doesn't begin the story gay, but as soon as he meets Maya, he can't help himself. There's certainly a lot of mystery behind human sexuality, but it seems like Kazuma's love for Shinya/Maya blossoms out of nowhere".

References

External links

2006 manga
Digital Manga Publishing titles
Drama anime and manga
Josei manga
Nihon Bungeisha manga
Yaoi anime and manga